Baron Edgar von Harold (30 May 1830 – 1 August 1886) was an influential Scarabaeidae expert and entomologist who was active in the 19th century.

Biography 
Edgar von Harold was born in Munich to a German family with Irish origins. He completed his early education at the court of the Bavarian King from where he graduated in the year 1848. In 1848 Harold joined the Royal Guard of the King of Bavaria where he would serve for twenty years. During this period he participated in the Austro-Prussian War and the Franco-Prussian War. At the end of his military career, Harold was sent on a trip to the coast of Spain and Morocco, to study the local insect fauna. After his retirement from the Royal Guard, Harold devoted his time fully to entomology.

One of the major contributions by Harold to the field is said to be the Catalogus Coleopterorum, which he co-authored with his friend Max Gemminger. They started the work in 1868 and the last volume of the work was published in 1876.

See also 
 :Category:Taxa named by Edgar von Harold

References

Further reading 
 Fairmaire, L. 1887. Notice Nécrologique sur M. le baron Edgar von Harold. Annales de la Société Entomologique de France 1887:47-48.
 McLachlan, Robert. 1886.  Obituary. Proceedings of the Entomological Society of London, pp. LXV-LXVI.

1830 births
1886 deaths
Barons of Germany
People of the German Empire
People from Upper Bavaria
Coleopterists
German entomologists